Nazarenko is a surname of Ukrainian origin, meaning son or daughter of Nazar. Notable people with the surname include:

 Aleksandr Nazarenko (born 1948), Russian historian
 Anastasia Nazarenko (born 1993), Russian gymnast
 Anatoly Nazarenko (born 1948), Kazakhstani wrestler
 Anton Nazarenko (born 1984), Russian badminton player
 Dmytro Nazarenko (born 1987), Ukrainian footballer
 Hryhory Nazarenko (1902–1997), Ukrainian bandura player
 Leonid Nazarenko (born 1955), Soviet-Russian football player and coach
 Liudmyla Nazarenko (born 1967), Ukrainian basketball player
 Nikolai Nazarenko (1911–1992), Don Cossack leader who fought for Germany in WWII
 Oleksandr Nazarenko (born 2000), Ukrainian football player
 Oleksandr Nazarenko (judoka) (born 1986), Ukrainian Paralympic judoka
 Olesya Nazarenko (born 1976), Turkmenistani wrestler and judoka
 Pavel Nazarenko (born 1995), Belarusian footballer
 Serhiy Nazarenko (born 1980), Ukrainian football player and manager
 Tatyana Nazarenko (born 1944), Russian painter
 Viktor Nazarenko (born 1956), Ukrainian military leader

See also
 

Ukrainian-language surnames
Surnames of Ukrainian origin